Southern Lamington is a rural locality in the Scenic Rim Region, Queensland, Australia. It borders New South Wales.

Geography 
The terrain is mountainous with numerous peaks including:
 Mount Razorback
 Mount Widgee
 Westray Mountain

The locality is entirely within the Lamington National Park.

History
The locality was named and bounded by Minister on 31 January 2003.

References 

Localities in Queensland
Scenic Rim Region